Arthur Van Haren Jr. (April 9, 1920 – August 11, 1992) was a World War II fighter pilot and considered the top fighter ace of World War II from Arizona. He may be one of very few highly decorated Hispanic fighter-pilot aces in the history of aerial warfare.

Van Haren was born in Superior, AZ. His mother was Rose Valenzuela and his father, Arthur Van Haren Sr., a popular boxing judge and baseball umpire who was inducted into the Arizona Sports Hall of Fame. Arthur Jr. shared his father's passion for sports becoming a star quarterback at Phoenix Union High School and playing for Coach Pop McKale at the University of Arizona.

World War II
While attending the University of Arizona in Tucson, AZ. Van Haren Jr. joined the Navy at the beginning of World War II, and was part of the famous U.S. Navy Fighting Squadron Two (VF-2) Rippers. VF-2 was featured in the October 23, 1944 Life Magazine edition as the "ace makers" squadron. Van Haren Jr. completed his naval aviation training in 1942. However, he was considered to be such a good pilot that the Navy made him a flight instructor, and he spent over a year teaching other Naval aviators how to fly.  That year as a flight instructor proved to be invaluable to Van Haren Jr. He was able to sharpen his flying and air gunnery skills and, at the same time, the U.S. Navy was in the process of moving from the F4F Wildcat to a more superior aircraft—the Grumman F6F Hellcat—as a way to better compete against and outclass the Japanese Zero.

Based on the USS Hornet (CV-12), a United States Navy aircraft carrier of the Essex class, Lt. Van Haren Jr. flew the F6F Hellcat. He downed nine confirmed enemy planes during grueling combat in the Pacific Theater skies, and had three additional unconfirmed kills. Three of his nine kills occurred in the Marianas Turkey Shoot. Some of his more notable squadron team members included Roy Voris, Daniel A. Carmichael Jr., and his commander, William A. Dean. Van Haren Jr. was awarded several medals and commendations including two Distinguished Flying Cross (United States) medals, the Air Medal, and the Presidential Unit Citation (United States). He is widely regarded as Arizona's top Navy fighter-pilot ace of World War II.

A journal kept by Van Haren Jr. sheds light on the routinely dangerous lives of being a fighter-pilot in the Pacific Theater during that time. One entry reads:

Life after the war

Following his service in the Navy, Van Haren Jr. received his law degree from the University of Arizona in 1948. As part of his legal career in Phoenix, Van Haren served as a deputy Maricopa County attorney, legal counsel to the Maricopa County Planning and Zoning Commission, and as a City of Phoenix municipal judge. However, the majority of his days as a lawyer were spent as a defense attorney in private practice. In 2007, Van Haren Jr. was featured in a book entitled "A Legal History of Maricopa County," which, among other things, documented the numerous practicing attorneys from Maricopa County who had proudly served in World War II.

Van Haren died in 1992 at the age of 72 in Dewey, Arizona. His wife of more than 50 years, Elizabeth Van Haren, died in May 2009.

See also

 Hispanic Americans in World War II
 Hispanics in the United States Navy

References

Recipients of the Distinguished Flying Cross (United States)
Arizona Wildcats football players
American people of Mexican descent
Mexican-American history
United States Navy officers
1920 births
1992 deaths
United States Navy pilots of World War II
Recipients of the Air Medal
American World War II flying aces